Edwina Jane Hume (born 30 April 1971) is an Australian politician who has been a senator for Victoria since 2016, representing the Liberal Party. She held both portfolios until May 2022, following the appointment of the Albanese ministry. Prior to her election to parliament she held senior positions in the banking, finance and superannuation sectors.

Early life
Hume was born in Melbourne on 30 April 1971. She is one of two daughters born to Steve and Louise Exell; her father was a senior executive with Quaker Oats and later worked as a management consultant and business broker. She grew up in the suburb of Armadale and attended Lauriston Girls' School. She graduated from the University of Melbourne with the degree of Bachelor of Commerce.

Career
Hume began working at the National Australia Bank (NAB) in 1995 as a sales and marketing research manager. She completed a graduate diploma in finance and investment with the Securities Institute of Australia in 1996, and subsequently worked with NAB as an investment manager (1996–1998) and private banker (1998–1999). She then moved to Rothschild Australia as a senior business development manager in the asset management division, and briefly as a key accounts manager. She left the workforce in 2002 to start a family, and from 2005 to 2006 served on the management committee of Perinatal Anxiety & Depression Australia (PANDA).

Hume was a vice-president of Deutsche Bank Australia from 2008 to 2009 and later served on the boards of the Royal Children's Hospital (2011–2016) and Fed Square Pty Ltd (2015–2016). Immediately before her election to parliament she was a senior strategic policy adviser with AustralianSuper.

Politics
Hume joined the Liberal Party in 2003. Before her election to the Senate, Hume held senior positions in the Liberal Party of Australia (Victorian Division), serving on the administrative committee, on the executive of the Women's Council, and as a delegate to state council. She was president of the party's Armadale branch.

Senate (2016–present)
In March 2016, Hume won Liberal preselection for the Coalition's Senate ticket at the next federal election. She was initially ranked in third position behind James Paterson and Nationals senator Bridget McKenzie, after losing to Paterson in the ballot for the top position. However, following a double dissolution she was elected in fifth position on the Coalition ticket at the 2016 federal election. Her candidacy was supported by the party's state president Michael Kroger.

Prior to the 2019 election, Hume stated she was "seriously considering" switching to the lower-house seat of Higgins in place of the retiring Kelly O'Dwyer. She subsequently declined to contest the preselection ballot, citing a need for "fresh talent". Prime Minister Scott Morrison subsequently intervened to ensure incumbent senators Hume and Paterson were re-endorsed, following opposition from the party's conservative wing.

In May 2019, Hume was appointed Assistant Minister for Superannuation, Financial Services and Financial Technology in the Morrison Government. In an interview with The Sydney Morning Herald after her appointment, she described Australia's superannuation system as "inefficient"  due to "high fees, duplicate accounts, underperforming funds and unnecessary insurance". She promised "a much broader vision for super" and said the government would make superannuation insurance voluntary for people under the age of 25 to reduce fees.

Hume's title was changed to Minister for Superannuation, Financial Services and the Digital Economy as part of a December 2020 cabinet reshuffle. In March 2021, following the allegations of sexual misconduct in parliament, she was additionally appointed Minister for Women's Economic Security, a new position. She held both portfolios until May 2022, following the appointment of the Albanese ministry.

Political views
Hume reportedly "holds socially liberal views". According to The Sydney Morning Herald, Hume is a member of the Moderate/Modern Liberal faction of the Liberal Party. In her maiden speech she said that "my side of politics owes it to our followers and to our most vulnerable to articulate a positive social justice agenda for the Right". She has described herself as a "lifelong monarchist".

In May 2021, Hume stated her philosophy on regulating the cryptocurrency sector, arguing that it was up to Australian investors to "be sensible enough to judge for themselves whether to put their hard earned money into higher-risk assets". She argued that cryptocurrency was subject to Australian laws - “it’s not a free pass” - but that she would not stand in the way of anyone who wanted to buy it. She also said that influencers and social media users offering investment advice should not be subject to the stricter guidelines imposed on registered financial advisers.

In September 2022, Hume spoke in favour of a bill to repeal the Euthanasia Laws Act 1997, which bars Australia's territory governments from legislating for assisted suicide. She had previously been in favour of the ban, but changed her mind following the death of her own terminally ill father via assisted suicide.

Personal life
Hume has three children with her ex-husband Andrew Hume.

References

1971 births
Living people
Liberal Party of Australia members of the Parliament of Australia
Members of the Australian Senate for Victoria
Members of the Australian Senate
Women members of the Australian Senate
University of Melbourne alumni
University of Melbourne women
21st-century Australian politicians
21st-century Australian women politicians
 Australian monarchists
Australian bankers
Australian financial businesspeople
People educated at Lauriston Girls' School